The Hessen-Darmstadt Kreis Regiment was created in 1697 in Gießen.

 1701-1714: Participation in the War of Spanish Succession
 1733-1735: Participation in the War of Polish Succession
 1747-1749: in Dutch service
 1756-1763: Participation in the Seven Years' War
 1790 incorporated as the 2nd Battalion of the regiment "Landgrave"

Colonels 

 1697-1707: Prince Charles William of Hesse-Darmstadt
 1709-1716: Prince Francis Ernest of Hessen-Darmstadt
 1716-1735: Count Philip Charles of Erbach-Fürstenau
 1738-1782: Prince George William of Hesse-Darmstadt

Army regiments of Germany
Army of the Holy Roman Empire